The simple station Ferias is part of the TransMilenio mass-transit system of Bogotá, Colombia, opened in the year 2000.

Location 

The station is located in northwestern Bogotá, specifically on Calle 80 with Transversal 69R.

It serves the Ferias, Las Ferias Occidental, and Santa Rosa neighborhoods.

Carrefour Calle 80 is situated on the north side of the station.

History 

In 2000, phase one of the TransMilenio system was opened between Portal de la 80 and Tercer Milenio, including this station.

The station is named Ferias due to the neighborhood of the same name that surrounds it.

Station Services

Old trunk services

Main line service

Feeder routes 

This station does not have connections to feeder routes.

Inter-city service 

This station does not have inter-city service.

External links 
 TransMilenio

See also 
 Bogotá
 TransMilenio
 List of TransMilenio Stations

TransMilenio